The Texas Parks & Wildlife Department (TPWD) is a Texas state agency that oversees and protects wildlife and their habitats.  In addition, the agency is responsible for managing the state's parks and historical areas.  Its mission is to manage and conserve the natural and cultural resources of Texas and to provide hunting, fishing, and outdoor recreation opportunities for the use and enjoyment of present and future generations.

The agency maintains its headquarters at 4200 Smith School Road in Austin, Texas.

History
In 1895, the Texas Legislature created the Fish and Oyster Commission to regulate fishing. The legislature added the Game Department to the commission in 1907. The Legislature created the State Parks Board as a separate entity in 1923.  In 1963, the Texas Parks and Wildlife Department was formed through merger of the State Parks Board and the Game and Fish Commission.

In 1983, the Texas legislature passed the Wildlife Conservation Act, giving the department the authority for managing fish and wildlife resources in all Texas counties. The department operates 95 state parks and historic sites, 51 wildlife management areas, eight fish hatcheries, and numerous field offices statewide.
On January 1, 2008 and September 1, 2019, TPWD transferred management of several historic sites to the Texas Historical Commission.

Employees
The agency employs more than 3,500 permanent employees, and 300 interns every summer, from every field of study.  Intern programs vary but are typically 12 weeks long and go from May until August.

Game wardens and Park Police Officers undergo a 30-week course at TPWD's Texas Game Warden Training Center in rural Hamilton County.

Organization

The department is made up of 12 divisions:

 Coastal Fisheries
 Communications
 Financial Resources
 Human Resources
 Information Technology
 Infrastructure
 Inland Fisheries
 Law Enforcement - Game wardens primarily enforce the provisions of the TPW Code but are fully empowered peace officers with statewide jurisdiction and may make arrests for any offense.
 Legal
 State Parks - includes Park Police Officers
 Support Resources
 Wildlife

Magazine
TPWD publishes Texas Parks and Wildlife, a monthly magazine available both in print and online editions. The magazine features articles and full-color photos on topics such as birding, boating, camping, fishing, hunting, state parks, travel, wildlife, and environmental issues.  Texas Parks and Wildlife has been in publication since 1942.

Television programs

Texas Parks & Wildlife
Texas Parks & Wildlife is a weekly, half-hour television series aired on Texas PBS stations, as well as on a number of other PBS stations around the country. Viewers can stream episodes on the PBS website and on the TPWD YouTube channel.

Originally titled Made in Texas, the series began production in 1985 as a magazine style show, with three or four different segments each week. For several years, the show focused on one topic each week, documentary style. In 1991, the name of the series changed to Texas Parks & Wildlife and reverted to its original magazine format.

Lone Star Law

Beginning in June 2016, TPWD Game Wardens were featured in a new reality television series on Animal Planet titled Lone Star Law.

Radio program
Passport to Texas is a daily series broadcast on radio stations throughout Texas. The series includes 90 second radio spots on topics, including wildlife, state parks, and outdoor activities.

Podcast
Under the Texas Sky features outdoor experiences of both everyday people and experts from inside and outside TPWD.

Texas Parks and Wildlife Foundation
Founded in 1991, the Texas Parks and Wildlife Foundation is the nonprofit funding partner of TPWD. Overseen by a board of trustees and administered by full- and part-time staff members, the foundation has raised over $205 million since its inception to ensure all Texans can enjoy, explore, and be inspired by the wild things and wild places in Texas.

See also

 List of Texas state parks
 List of Texas Wildlife Management Areas
 List of State Fish and Wildlife Management Agencies in the U.S.
 Texas State Railroad

References

External links
 Texas Parks & Wildlife Department website
 Texas Parks & Wildlife Foundation website
 Texas Parks & Wildlife magazine
 Passport to Texas website
Moving images from the Texas Parks & Wildlife Department available on the Texas Archive of the Moving Image
Parks Under the Lone Star, exhibit of moving images of Texas state and national parks by the Texas Archive of the Moving Image

Parks and Wildlife Department, Texas
State law enforcement agencies of Texas
State environmental protection agencies of the United States
State wildlife and natural resource agencies of the United States